Kollam KSRTC bus station is an important transport hub in the Indian city of Kollam, owned and operated by the Kerala State Road Transport Corporation (KSRTC) under the depot code KLM. The bus station is located in Taluk Cutchery and is close to Kerala State Water Transport Department's Kollam City water transport terminal. Long distance intrastate, inter-state and city buses run regularly  from the bus station. The bus station comes under Kollam Zone of Kerala State Road Transport Corporation.

Services
Kollam KSRTC bus station is one among the major KSRTC depots in the state. Because of the geographical position of Kollam, the depot is easily handling service through National Highways – NH 66 (formerly NH 47), NH 183 (formerly NH 220), NH 744 (formerly NH 208) of Kerala. Inter-state service towards Thoothukkudi, Madurai, Tirunelveli, Tenkasi are also running from here. The depot is also serving as a hub for KURTC's A/C Volvo Kollam city bus services & Kollam-Thiruvananthapuram Intercity A/C Volvo Bus services. KSRTC's regular A/C Garuda, Super Deluxe, Super Express, Super Fast, Limited Stop, Fast Passenger, Ordinary and all the other services are plying through this depot. Kollam zone of KSRTC is the second most revenue generating zone in Kerala.

On 8 January 2018, Kollam KSRTC Zone set a record in ticket collection by generating ₹1,92,12,134 (RTC ₹ 1,57, 97,932 and JNNURM ₹34,14,202); ₹7.44 was the total collection of KSRTC for that day.

Modernization
 Kollam Depot will soon become a part of KSRTC's real-time booking system. The facility will allow booking of ticket online from a boarding point other than the starting centre and destination if seats are available after the bus begins its service, with the help of a new set of electronic ticket machines (ETMs) that would have the technology to alert headquarters about vacant seats on a running bus.
 As part of the modernization and qualitative improvement of KSRTC, total computerization and e-governance systems, data centre, GPRS control rooms at five centres, integration of control room, computers in the main office etc. would be setting-up in the Kollam depot, along with Thiruvananthapuram, Ernakulam, Thrissur and Kozhikode.

KSRTC also have a plan to start an operating centre in the Andamukkam City bus stand situated at Downtown Kollam area.

See also
 Kollam Junction railway station
 Chinnakada

References

External links

Bus stations in Kollam
Bus stations in Kerala